Charles H. Ireland House was a historic home located at Greensboro, Guilford County, North Carolina. It was built in 1904, and was a large -story, three bay, granite, brick, and frame structure with Colonial Revival, Classical Revival and Queen Anne style design elements.  It featured a pedimented two-story portico with Ionic order columns and a steeply pitched gambrel roof. It was destroyed by fire February 2, 1996.

It was listed on the National Register of Historic Places in 1979.

References

Houses on the National Register of Historic Places in North Carolina
Queen Anne architecture in North Carolina
Colonial Revival architecture in North Carolina
Neoclassical architecture in North Carolina
Houses completed in 1904
Houses in Greensboro, North Carolina
National Register of Historic Places in Guilford County, North Carolina
1904 establishments in North Carolina